Mark Woodforde was the defending champion and won in the final 7–5, 1–6, 7–5 against Patrik Kühnen.

Seeds

  Andrei Chesnokov (first round)
  Darren Cahill (first round)
  Slobodan Živojinović (first round)
  Mark Woodforde (champion)
  Wally Masur (quarterfinals)
  John Frawley (first round)
  Patrik Kühnen (final)
  Jason Stoltenberg (second round)

Draw

Finals

Top half

Bottom half

External links
 1989 South Australian Open Draw

Sin